District 12 of the Oregon State Senate comprises parts of Washington, Yamhill, Polk, Marion, and Benton counties. It is currently represented by Independent Brian Boquist of McMinnville.

Election results
District boundaries have changed over time, therefore, senators before 2013 may not represent the same constituency as today. From 1993 until 2003, the district covered parts Clackamas County, and from 2003 until 2013 it covered a slightly different area in the Willamette Valley.

References

12
Benton County, Oregon
Marion County, Oregon
Polk County, Oregon
Washington County, Oregon
Yamhill County, Oregon